Spirit Bound Flesh (2001) is the first solo CD by Scott Kelly from Neurosis, consisting mostly of acoustic country/folk music influenced by Johnny Cash. This was the last album Scott performed on before going sober.

Track listing
"I Don't Feel You Anymore" – 3:44
"The Passage" – 4:11
"In Her Room" – 3:05
"Return to All" – 4:51
"Sacred Heart" – 4:16
"Flower" – 3:23
"Through My Existence" – 6:37
"The Honor of My Prisoner" – 4:55

References

2001 albums
Scott Kelly (musician) albums